Breckenridge Independent School District is a public school district based in Breckenridge, Texas (USA).

Finances
As of the 2010–2011 school year, the appraised valuation of property in the district was $850,849,000. The maintenance tax rate was $0.104 and the bond tax rate was $0.008 per $100 of appraised valuation.

Academic achievement
In 2011, the school district was rated "recognized" by the Texas Education Agency.  Thirty-five percent of districts in Texas in 2011 received the same rating. No state accountability ratings will be given to districts in 2012. A school district in Texas can receive one of four possible rankings from the Texas Education Agency: Exemplary (the highest possible ranking), Recognized, Academically Acceptable, and Academically Unacceptable (the lowest possible ranking).

Historical district TEA accountability ratings
2011: Recognized
2010: Academically Acceptable
2009: Academically Acceptable
2008: Academically Acceptable
2007: Academically Acceptable
2006: Academically Acceptable
2005: Academically Acceptable
2004: Academically Acceptable

Schools
In the 2011–2012 school year, the district operated five schools.
Breckenridge High School (Grades 9-12)
Breckenridge Junior High School (Grades 7-8)
South Elementary School (Grades 4-6)
North Elementary School (Grades 2-3)
East Elementary School (Grades PK-1)

Special programs

Athletics
Breckenridge High School participates in the boys sports of baseball, basketball, football, and wrestling. The school participates in the girls sports of basketball, softball, and volleyball. For the 2012 through 2014 school years, Breckenridge High School will play football in UIL Class 2A Division I.

See also

List of school districts in Texas
List of high schools in Texas

References

External links
Breckenridge ISD

School districts in Stephens County, Texas